Just Another Girl may refer to:

Songs
"Just Another Girl" (Monica song)
"Just Another Girl" (The Killers song)
"Just Another Girl" by Johnny Thunders, from the album In Cold Blood
"Just Another Girl" by Shaggy (feat. Tarrus Riley), from the album Summer in Kingston
"Just Another Girl" by Kim Jaejoong, from the album WWW
"Just Another Girl" by Ken Boothe